Marion Lake is a subalpine lake located in Linn County of the U.S. state of Oregon. The lake is in central Oregon's Cascades within the Mount Jefferson Wilderness.

It is the largest lake in an Oregon wilderness area and the largest lake not accessible by automobile. With the exception of large Waldo Lake, it is the largest natural lake in the Willamette National Forest on the west slope of the Central Cascade Range.

Marion Lake was named in 1874 by John Minto's Marion County road-viewing party in 1874. Marion County, in turn, had been named for General Francis Marion of Revolutionary War fame.

It is the headwaters of Marion Creek, a tributary of the North Santiam River.

The rough-skinned newt (Taricha granulosa) is found at Marion Lake during the amphibian's breeding season.

See also
 List of lakes in Oregon

References

Lakes of Oregon
Lakes of Linn County, Oregon
Willamette National Forest
Protected areas of Linn County, Oregon